"Te Siento" (English: I Feel You) is a song performed by reggaeton duo Wisin & Yandel. The song is taken from Wisin & Yandel's re-release studio album Evolution. It was released as the third single on December 15, 2009. On November 5, 2009 a part of the song was performed first time on the Latin Grammy Awards 2009 along with "Abusadora", using a short intro-video to perform.

Music video 
 
The music video for the song was filmed in October 2009 on Los Angeles in conjunction with the music video for their previous single "Imagínate".

The director for the video was Jessy Terrero who has filmed most of Wisin & Yandel's music videos. On the music video they sing on a stage with neon lights and girls dancing around them. It was premiered on December 2, 2009.

The video for the remix featuring Franco "El Gorila" was released on February 18, 2010, the plot of the video it's simply the original version with Franco's raps thrown in the video.

Charts

Year-end charts

Versions/Remixes 
Album version — 4:19 

Remix (featuring Jowell & Randy) — 4:50
Remix (featuring Franco "El Gorila") — 4:20

References

External links 
Official website

2009 singles
Wisin & Yandel songs
Music videos directed by Jessy Terrero
Spanish-language songs
Songs written by Wisin
Songs written by Yandel
2009 songs
Machete Music singles